Piazza del Popolo may refer to:

 Piazza del Popolo, Rome
 Piazza del Popolo, Cesena
 Piazza del Popolo, Fermo
 Piazza del Popolo, Todi
 Piazza del Popolo, Ascoli Piceno